Z Chamaeleontis (abbreviated Z Cha) is a dwarf nova variable star system approximately 377 light-years away from the Sun, where two stars orbit each other every 1.78 hours. The system comprises an eclipsing white dwarf and red dwarf and possibly a yet unconfirmed third low-mass substellar companion.

Substellar companion 

Dai et al. (2009) invoke the presence of a third object to explain orbital period variations with an apparent periodicity of roughly 28 years. The third body could yield a minimum mass 20 times greater than Jupiter and be located 9.9 Astronomical Units away from the dwarf nova, being likely a low-mass brown dwarf.

See also 
 HW Virginis
 NN Serpentis
 OY Carinae

References 

Chamaeleon (constellation)
Eclipsing binaries
Dwarf novae
Hypothetical planetary systems
Chamaeleontis, Z
White dwarfs
M-type main-sequence stars